Mohammad Hassan Rahnavardi (born 10 May 1927) is an Iranian physician, politician and former weightlifter. He was born in Tabriz. He earned two gold medals in Asian Games in 1950s. He was a member of National Consultative Assembly from Sari and later from Tehran. He was a deputy minister of health and minister of education prior to the Iranian Islamic revolution. His last position was Governor of Yazd.

He has a Doctor of Dental Surgery from the University of Tehran, a master of public health from Johns Hopkins University and a DrPH from Tulane University. For five years he was the secretary general of the Iranian National Olympic Committee and in charge of Iranian Olympic Team for 1968 Mexico City Games and 1972 Munich Games in Germany.

References 

 اتفاقات جالب المپیک/ اتهام چاقوکشی به یک قهرمان و 
 Hassan Rahnavardi's profile at Sports Reference.com

1927 births
Living people
Iranian male weightlifters
People from Sari, Iran
Deputies of Tehran for National Consultative Assembly
World Weightlifting Championships medalists
Weightlifters at the 1952 Summer Olympics
Weightlifters at the 1956 Summer Olympics
Olympic weightlifters of Iran
Asian Games gold medalists for Iran
Asian Games medalists in weightlifting
Weightlifters at the 1951 Asian Games
Weightlifters at the 1958 Asian Games
Johns Hopkins Bloomberg School of Public Health alumni
Tulane University School of Public Health and Tropical Medicine alumni
Sportspeople from Tabriz
Medalists at the 1951 Asian Games
Medalists at the 1958 Asian Games
Sportspeople from Sari, Iran
20th-century Iranian people